Skutnik is a family name of Romanian origin, derived from the historical term scutnic.

People
Lenny Skutnik, United States hero
Ed Skutnik, the owner of Radio Skutnik

Other usages
Lenny Skutniks, notable people who, as an honor, are invited to sit in the gallery at joint meeting of Congress
Radio Skutnik,  a former broadcasting company in Massachusetts

Romanian-language surnames